Gölcük is a village in the District of Karpuzlu, Aydın Province, Turkey. In 2010 it had a population of 752.

References

Villages in Karpuzlu District